Syria national amateur boxing athletes represents Syria in regional, continental and world tournaments and matches sanctioned by the amateur International Boxing Association (AIBA).

Asian Games

2006 Doha Asian Games

Twelve boxers represented Syria in this edition of the Asiad. With one bronze medal, this country is ranked 11th  in a four-way tie in the boxing medal tally.

Entry list

First Class
 Naser Al Shami (Heavyweight) - Bronze  
 Amjad Aouda (Light Flyweight) 
 Mohammad Dmirieh (Featherweight) 
 Mustafa Farrah (Middleweight)
 Ahmad Sheikh Ismael (Super Heavyweight) 
 Yasser Shikhan (Lightweight) 
 Eshak Wawz (Welterweight)

Second Class
 Amer Sheikh Ismael (Heavyweight) 
 Kareem Sarhan (Light Flyweight) 
 Jamal Taha (Featherweight) 
 Ameer Qataf (Middleweight)
 Mason Al Nouri (Super Heavyweight)

References

Amateur boxing
Boxing in Syria
Boxing